Mark William James Patterson (born 1970) is a New Zealand politician and former Member of Parliament in the House of Representatives for the New Zealand First party.

Career before politics
Patterson had a career as a sheep farmer in Lawrence, Otago, and was involved with the Meat Industry Excellence Group.

Political career
Patterson was previously involved with the National Party and unsuccessfully contested the nomination for the  electorate in 2014 upon Bill English's decision to become a List MP, but lost to Todd Barclay.

Patterson was announced as the New Zealand First candidate for the newly formed Taieri electorate for the 2020 general election.

Member of parliament

In  Patterson stood for New Zealand First in the  electorate and was placed 7 on the New Zealand First's party list. He duly entered parliament via the party list.

As a member of Parliament, Patterson serves as a member on both the Education and Workforce, and, Primary Production Select Committees. Patterson is the New Zealand First Party spokesperson for Agriculture and Primary Industry, Bio-Security, Christchurch Earthquake Recovery, Crown Minerals, Customs, Food Safety, Intellectual Property, and Land Information.

Patterson has sponsored a total of three bills in his first parliamentary term, the New Zealand Superannuation and Retirement Income (Fair Residency) Amendment Bill, the Gore District Council (Otama Rural Water Supply) Bill, and the Farm Debt Mediation Bill.

During the 2020 general election held on 17 October, Patterson unsuccessfully contested Taieri, coming fourth place. He and his fellow NZ First MPs lost their seats after the party's vote dropped to 2.7%, below the five percent threshold needed to enter Parliament.

References

1970 births
Living people
New Zealand First MPs
New Zealand National Party politicians
Members of the New Zealand House of Representatives
New Zealand list MPs
Candidates in the 2017 New Zealand general election
Unsuccessful candidates in the 2020 New Zealand general election